Polášek (feminine Polášková) is a Czech surname, it may refer to:

 Adam Polášek, Czech ice hockey player
 Albin Polasek (1879–1965), Czech-American sculptor and educator
 Albin Polasek House and Studio, historic site in Winter Park, Florida, United States
 Barbara Polášek (1939–), a German-born Czech classical guitarist (née Effenberger), married to Jan, see Barbara Probst-Polášek
 Filip Polášek (born 1985), professional tennis player from Slovakia
 Jan Polášek, Czech cellist
 Libor Polášek (born 1974), retired Czech professional ice hockey centre
 Petra Polášková, Czech footballer
 Viktor Polášek, Czech ski jumper

Czech-language surnames